Fanny Östlund (born 5 May 1997) is a Swedish tennis player.

Östlund has a career-high singles ranking by the Women's Tennis Association (WTA) of 478, achieved on 4 April 2022. She also has a career-high WTA doubles ranking of 386, achieved on 16 April 2018. She has won three singles titles and twelve doubles titles on the ITF Circuit. 

Östlund competes for Sweden in the Billie Jean King Cup, where she has a win/loss record of 0–1.

ITF Circuit finals

Singles: 8 (3 titles, 5 runner-ups)

Doubles: 21 (12 titles, 9 runner-ups)

Notes

References

External links
 
 
 

1997 births
Living people
Swedish female tennis players
20th-century Swedish women
21st-century Swedish women